The 1985 Colgate Red Raiders football team was an American football team that represented Colgate University during the 1985 NCAA Division I-AA football season. 

In its tenth season under head coach Frederick Dunlap, the team compiled an 7–3–1 record. Tom Burgess and Bill Hecht were the team captains. 

The Red Raiders spent four weeks in the national top 20 rankings, reaching as high as No. 14, but fell out of the rankings by season's end.

This would be Colgate's final year as an independent, before joining the Colonial League. Future league football opponents on the Red Raiders' 1985 schedule included Lafayette, Lehigh and Holy Cross. The league was later renamed Patriot League, and continues to be Colgate's home conference as of 2020.

The team played its home games at Andy Kerr Stadium in Hamilton, New York.

Schedule

References

Colgate
Colgate Raiders football seasons
Colgate Red Raiders football